The Canton of Brouvelieures is a former French administrative and electoral grouping of communes in the Vosges département of eastern France and in the region of Lorraine. It was disbanded following the French canton reorganisation which came into effect in March 2015. It consisted of 10 communes, which joined the canton of Bruyères in 2015. It had 2,677 inhabitants (2012).

One of 9 cantons in the arrondissement of Saint-Dié-des-Vosges, the canton of Brouvelieures had its administrative centre at Brouvelieures.

Composition
The Canton of Brouvelieures comprised the following 10 communes:

 Belmont-sur-Buttant 
 Biffontaine 
 Bois-de-Champ 
 Brouvelieures 
 Domfaing 
 Fremifontaine 
 Mortagne 
 Les Poulières 
 Les Rouges-Eaux 
 Vervezelle

References

Brouvelieures
2015 disestablishments in France
States and territories disestablished in 2015